An incomplete list of participants at the Battle of Badr.

Names of Muslim participants and the Martyrs
1. Muhammad
2. Abu Bakar as-Siddiq
3. Umar bin al-Khattab
4. Uthman bin Affan (Muhammad asked him to stay back to look after his wife. However, he also told him that he will have the same rewards and share of the bounty as anyone who took part in the Battle)
5. Ali bin Abu Talib
6. Talhah bin ‘Ubaidillah
7. Bilal bin Rabah
8. Hamzah bin Abdul Muttalib
9. Abdullah bin Jahsyi
10. Al-Zubair bin al-Awwam
11. Mus’ab bin Umair bin Hashim
12. Abdur Rahman bin ‘Auf
13. Abdullah bin Mas’ud
14. Sa’ad bin Abi Waqqas
15. Abu Kabshah al-Farisi
16. Anasah al-Habsyi
17. Zaid bin Harithah al-Kalbi
18. Marthad bin Abi Marthad al-Ghanawi
19. Abu Marthad al-Ghanawi
20. Al-Husain bin al-Harith bin Abdul Muttalib
21. ‘Ubaidah bin al-Harith bin Abdul Muttalib
22. Al-Tufail bin al-Harith bin Abdul Muttalib
23. Mistah bin Usasah bin ‘Ubbad bin Abdul Muttalib
24. Abu Huzaifah bin ‘Utbah bin Rabi’ah
25. Subaih (servant of Abi ‘Asi bin Umayyah)
26. Salim (servant of Abu Huzaifah)
27. Sinan bin Muhsin
28. ‘Ukasyah bin Muhsin
29. Sinan bin Abi Sinan
30. Abu Sinan bin Muhsin
31. Syuja’ bin Wahab
32. ‘Utbah bin Wahab
33. Yazid bin Ruqais
34. Muhriz bin Nadhlah
35. Rabi’ah bin Aksam
36. Thaqfu bin Amir
37. Malik bin Amir
38. Mudlij bin Amir
39. Abu Makhsyi Suwaid bin Makhsyi al-Ta’i
40. ‘Utbah bin Ghazwan
41. Khabbab (servant of ‘Utbah bin Ghazwan)
42. Hathib bin Abi Balta’ah al-Lakhmi
43. Sa’ad al-Kalbi (servant of Hathib)
44. Suwaibit bin Sa’ad bin Harmalah
45. Umair bin Abi Waqqas
46. Al-Miqdad bin ‘Amru
47. Mas’ud bin Rabi’ah
48. Zus Syimalain Amru bin Amru
49. Khabbab bin al-Arat al-Tamimi
50. Amir bin Fuhairah
51. Suhaib bin Sinan
52. Abu Salamah bin Abdul Asad
53. Syammas bin Uthman
54. Al-Arqam bin Abi al-Arqam
55. Ammar bin Yasir
56. Mu’attib bin ‘Auf al-Khuza’i
57. Zaid bin al-Khattab
58. Amru bin Suraqah
59. Abdullah bin Suraqah
60. Sa’id bin Zaid bin Amru
61. Mihja bin Akk (servant of Umar bin al-Khattab)
62. Waqid bin Abdullah al-Tamimi
63. Khauli bin Abi Khauli al-Ijli
64. Malik bin Abi Khauli al-Ijli
65. Amir bin Rabi’ah
66. Amir bin al-Bukair
67. Aqil bin al-Bukair
68. Khalid bin al-Bukair
69. Iyas bin al-Bukair
70. Uthman bin Maz’un
71. Qudamah bin Maz’un
72. Abdullah bin Maz’un
73. Al-Saib bin Uthman bin Maz’un
74. Ma’mar bin al-Harith
75. Khunais bin Huzafah
76. Abu Sabrah bin Abi Ruhm
77. Abdullah bin Makhramah
78. Abdullah bin Suhail bin Amru
79. Wahab bin Sa’ad bin Abi Sarah
80. Hatib bin Amru
81. Umair bin Auf
82. Sa’ad bin Khaulah
83. Abu Ubaidah Amir al-Jarah
84. Amru bin al-Harith
85. Suhail bin Wahab bin Rabi’ah
86. Safwan bin Wahab
87. Amru bin Abi Sarah bin Rabi’ah
88. Sa’ad bin Muaz
89. Amru bin Muaz
90. Al-Harith bin Aus
91. Al-Harith bin Anas
92. Sa’ad bin Zaid bin Malik
93. Salamah bin Salamah bin Waqsyi
94. ‘Ubbad bin Waqsyi
95. Salamah bin Thabit bin Waqsyi
96. Rafi’ bin Yazid bin Kurz
97. Al-Harith bin Khazamah bin ‘Adi
98. Muhammad bin Maslamah al-Khazraj
99. Salamah bin Aslam bin Harisy
100. Abul Haitham bin al-Tayyihan
101. ‘Ubaid bin Tayyihan
102. Abdullah bin Sahl
103. Qatadah bin Nu’man bin Zaid
104. Ubaid bin Aus
105. Nasr bin al-Harith bin ‘Abd
106. Mu’attib bin ‘Ubaid
107. Abdullah bin Tariq al-Ba’lawi
108. Mas’ud bin Sa’ad
109. Abu Absi Jabr bin Amru
110. Abu Burdah Hani’ bin Niyyar al-Ba’lawi
111. Asim bin Thabit bin Abi al-Aqlah
112. Mu’attib bin Qusyair bin Mulail
113. Abu Mulail bin al-Az’ar bin Zaid
114. Umair bin Mab’ad bin al-Az’ar
115. Sahl bin Hunaif bin Wahib
116. Abu Lubabah Basyir bin Abdul Munzir
117. Mubasyir bin Abdul Munzir
118. Rifa’ah bin Abdul Munzir
119. Sa’ad bin ‘Ubaid bin al-Nu’man
120. ‘Uwaim bin Sa’dah bin ‘Aisy
121. Rafi’ bin Anjadah
122. ‘Ubaidah bin Abi ‘Ubaid
123. Tha’labah bin Hatib
124. Unais bin Qatadah bin Rabi’ah
125. Ma’ni bin Adi al-Ba’lawi
126. Thabit bin Akhram al-Ba’lawi
127. Zaid bin Aslam bin Tha’labah al-Ba’lawi
128. Rib’ie bin Rafi’ al-Ba’lawi
129. Asim bin Adi al-Ba’lawi
130. Jubr bin ‘Atik
131. Malik bin Numailah al-Muzani
132. Al-Nu’man bin ‘Asr al-Ba’lawi
133. Abdullah bin Jubair
134. Asim bin Qais bin Thabit
135. Abu Dhayyah bin Thabit bin al-Nu’man
136. Abu Hayyah bin Thabit bin al-Nu’man
137. Salim bin Amir bin Thabit
138. Al-Harith bin al-Nu’man bin Umayyah
139. Khawwat bin Jubair bin al-Nu’man
140. Al-Munzir bin Muhammad bin ‘Uqbah
141. Abu ‘Uqail bin Abdullah bin Tha’labah
142. Sa’ad bin Khaithamah
143. Munzir bin Qudamah bin Arfajah
144. Tamim (servant of Sa’ad bin Khaithamah)
145. Al-Harith bin Arfajah
146. Kharijah bin Zaid bin Abi Zuhair
147. Sa’ad bin al-Rabi’ bin Amru
148. Abdullah bin Rawahah
149. Khallad bin Suwaid bin Tha’labah
150. Basyir bin Sa’ad bin Tha’labah
151. Sima’ bin Sa’ad bin Tha’labah
152. Subai bin Qais bin ‘Isyah
153. ‘Ubbad bin Qais bin ‘Isyah
154. Abdullah bin Abbas
155. Yazid bin al-Harith bin Qais
156. Khubaib bin Isaf bin ‘Atabah
157. Abdullah bin Zaid bin Tha’labah
158. Huraith bin Zaid bin Tha’labah
159. Sufyan bin Bisyr bin Amru
160. Tamim bin Ya’ar bin Qais
161. Abdullah bin Umair
162. Zaid bin al-Marini bin Qais
163. Abdullah bin ‘Urfutah
164. Abdullah bin Rabi’ bin Qais
165. Abdullah bin Abdullah bin Ubai
166. Aus bin Khauli bin Abdullah
167. Zaid bin Wadi’ah bin Amru
168. ‘Uqbah bin Wahab bin Kaladah
169. Rifa’ah bin Amru bin Amru bin Zaid
170. Amir bin Salamah
171. Abu Khamishah Ma’bad bin Ubbad
172. Amir bin al-Bukair
173. Naufal bin Abdullah bin Nadhlah
174. ‘Utban bin Malik bin Amru bin al-Ajlan
175. ‘Ubadah bin al-Somit
176. Aus bin al-Somit
177. Al-Nu’man bin Malik bin Tha’labah
178. Thabit bin Huzal bin Amru bin Qarbus
179. Malik bin Dukhsyum bin Mirdhakhah
180. Al-Rabi’ bin Iyas bin Amru bin Ghanam
181. Waraqah bin Iyas bin Ghanam
182. Amru bin Iyas
183. Al-Mujazzar bin Ziyad bin Amru
184. ‘Ubadah bin al-Khasykhasy
185. Nahhab bin Tha’labah bin Khazamah
186. Abdullah bin Tha’labah bin Khazamah
187. Utbah bin Rabi’ah al-Khazraji
188. Abu Dujanah Sima’ bin Kharasyah
189. Al-Munzir bin Amru bin Khunais
190. Abu Usaid bin Malik bin Rabi’ah
191. Malik bin Mas’ud bin al-Badan
192. Abu Rabbihi bin Haqqi bin Aus
193. Ka’ab bin Humar al-Juhani
194. Dhamrah bin Amru
195. Ziyad bin Amru
196. Basbas bin Amru
197. Abdullah bin Amir al-Ba’lawi
198. Khirasy bin al-Shimmah bin Amru
199. Al-Hubab bin al-Munzir bin al-Jamuh
200. Umair bin al-Humam bin al-Jamuh
201. Tamim (servant of Khirasy bin al-Shimmah)
202. Abdullah bin Amru bin Haram
203. Muaz bin Amru bin al-Jamuh
204. Mu’awwiz bin Amru bin al-Jamuh
205. Khallad bin Amru bin al-Jamuh
206. ‘Uqbah bin Amir bin Nabi bin Zaid
207. Hubaib bin Aswad
208. Thabit bin al-Jiz’i
209. Umair bin al-Harith bin Labdah
210. Basyir bin al-Barra’ bin Ma’mur
211. Al-Tufail bin al-Nu’man bin Khansa’
212. Sinan bin Saifi bin Sakhr bin Khansa’
213. Abdullah bin al-Jaddi bin Qais
214. Atabah bin Abdullah bin Sakhr
215. Jabbar bin Umaiyah bin Sakhr
216. Kharijah bin Humayyir al-Asyja’i
217. Abdullah bin Humayyir al-Asyja’i
218. Yazid bin al-Munzir bin Sahr
219. Ma’qil bin al-Munzir bin Sahr
220. Abdullah bin al-Nu’man bin Baldumah
221. Al-Dhahlak bin Harithah bin Zaid
222. Sawad bin Razni bin Zaid
223. Ma’bad bin Qais bin Sakhr bin Haram
224. Abdullah bin Qais bin Sakhr bin Haram
225. Abdullah bin Abdi Manaf
226. Jabir bin Abdullah bin Riab
227. Khulaidah bin Qais bin al-Nu’man
228. An-Nu’man bin Yasar
229. Abu al-Munzir Yazid bin Amir
230. Qutbah bin Amir bin Hadidah
231. Sulaim bin Amru bin Hadidah
232. Antarah (servant of Qutbah bin Amir)
233. Abbas bin Amir bin Adi
234. Abul Yasar Ka’ab bin Amru bin Abbad
235. Sahl bin Qais bin Abi Ka’ab bin al-Qais
236. Amru bin Talqi bin Zaid bin Umaiyah
237. Muaz bin Jabal bin Amru bin Aus
238. Qais bin Mihshan bin Khalid
239. Abu Khalid al-Harith bin Qais bin Khalid
240. Jubair bin Iyas bin Khalid
241. Abu Ubadah Sa’ad bin Uthman
242. ‘Uqbah bin Uthman bin Khaladah
243. Ubadah bin Qais bin Amir bin Khalid
244. As’ad bin Yazid bin al-Fakih
245. Al-Fakih bin Bisyr
246. Zakwan bin Abdu Qais bin Khaladah
247. Muaz bin Ma’ish bin Qais bin Khaladah
248. Aiz bin Ma’ish bin Qais bin Khaladah
249. Mas’ud bin Qais bin Khaladah
250. Rifa’ah bin Rafi’ bin al-Ajalan
251. Khallad bin Rafi’ bin al-Ajalan
252. Ubaid bin Yazid bin Amir bin al-Ajalan
253. Ziyad bin Lubaid bin Tha’labah
254. Khalid bin Qais bin al-Ajalan
255. Rujailah bin Tha’labah bin Khalid
256. Atiyyah bin Nuwairah bin Amir
257. Khalifah bin Adi bin Amru
258. Rafi’ bin al-Mu’alla bin Luzan
259. Abu Ayyub bin Khalid al-Ansari
260. Thabit bin Khalid bin al-Nu’man
261. ‘Umarah bin Hazmi bin Zaid
262. Suraqah bin Ka’ab bin Abdul Uzza
263. Suhail bin Rafi’ bin Abi Amru
264. Adi bin Abi al-Zaghba’ al-Juhani
265. Mas’ud bin Aus bin Zaid
266. Abu Khuzaimah bin Aus bin Zaid
267. Rafi’ bin al-Harith bin Sawad bin Zaid
268. Auf bin al-Harith bin Rifa’ah
269. Mu’awwaz bin al-Harith bin Rifa’ah
270. Muaz bin al-Harith bin Rifa’ah
271. An-Nu’man bin Amru bin Rifa’ah
272. Abdullah bin Qais bin Khalid
273. Wadi’ah bin Amru al-Juhani
274. Ishmah al-Asyja’i
275. Thabit bin Amru bin Zaid bin Adi
276. Sahl bin ‘Atik bin al-Nu’man
277. Tha’labah bin Amru bin Mihshan
278. Al-Harith bin al-Shimmah bin Amru
279. Ubai bin Ka’ab bin Qais
280. Anas bin Muaz bin Anas bin Qais
281. Aus bin Thabit bin al-Munzir bin Haram
282. Abu Syeikh bin Ubai bin Thabit
283. Abu Tolhah bin Zaid bin Sahl
284. Abu Syeikh Ubai bin Thabit
285. Harithah bin Suraqah bin al-Harith
286. Amru bin Tha’labah bin Wahb bin Adi
287. Salit bin Qais bin Amru bin ‘Atik
288. Abu Salit bin Usairah bin Amru
289. Thabit bin Khansa’ bin Amru bin Malik
290. Amir bin Umaiyyah bin Zaid
291. Muhriz bin Amir bin Malik
292. Sawad bin Ghaziyyah
293. Abu Zaid Qais bin Sakan
294. Abul A’war bin al-Harith bin Zalim
295. Sulaim bin Milhan
296. Haram bin Milhan
297. Qais bin Abi Sha’sha’ah
298. Abdullah bin Ka’ab bin Amru
299. ‘Ishmah al-Asadi
300. Abu Daud Umair bin Amir bin Malik
301. Suraqah bin Amru bin ‘Atiyyah
302. Qais bin Mukhallad bin Tha’labah
303. Al-Nu’man bin Abdi Amru bin Mas’ud
304. Al-Dhahhak bin Abdi Amru
305. Sulaim bin al-Harith bin Tha’labah
306. Jabir bin Khalid bin Mas’ud
307. Sa’ad bin Suhail bin Abdul Asyhal
308. Ka’ab bin Zaid bin Qais
309. Bujir bin Abi Bujir al-Abbasi
310. ‘Itban bin Malik bin Amru al-Ajalan
311. ‘Ismah bin al-Hushain bin Wabarah
312. Hilal bin al-Mu’alla al-Khazraj
313. Awleh bin Syuqrat (assistant of Muhammad)

Names Alphabetically (Arabic)

 Muhammad ibn 'Abdillah
 Ali ibn Abi Talib al-Muhajiri
 Abi bakar , Abdullah bin Qahafa
 Umar ibn al-Khattab al-Muhajiri
 Talha ibn 'Ubaydillah al-Muhajiri
 Zubayr ibn al-'Awwam al-Muhajiri
 Abdu'rRahman ibn 'Awf al-Muhajiri
 Sa'd ibn Abi Waqqas, Malik ibn Uhayb al-Muhajiri
 Sa'ad ibn Zayd al-Muhajiri
 Abi 'Ubayda 'amir ibn 'Abdillah ibn al-Jarrah al-Muhajiri

Alif
 Ubayy ibn Ka'b al-Khazraji
 al-Akhnas ibn Khubayb al-Muhajiri
 al-Arqam ibn Abi'l Arqam al-Muhajiri
 As'ad ibn Yazeed al-Khazraji
 Anas ibn Mu'adh al-Khazraji
Anas ibn Malik al-Khazraji 
 Anasah, mawla Rasulillah al-Muhajiri
 Unays ibn Qatadah al-Awsi
 Aws ibn Thabit al-Khazraji
 Aws ibn Khawla al-Khazraji
 Aws ibn as-Samit al-Khazraji
 Iyas ibn al-Aws al-Awsi
 Iyas ibn al-Bukayr al-Muhajiri

Ba'

 Bujayr ibn Abi Bujayr al-Khazraji
 Bahhath ibn Tha'laba al-Khazraji
 Basbas ibn 'Amr al-Khazraji
 Bishr ibn Bara' ibn Ma'rar al-Khazraji
 Bashar ibn Sa'd al-Khazraji
 Bilal ibn Rabah al-Muhajiri

Ta'
 
 Tameem ibn Yu'ar al-Khazraji
 Tameem mawla Bana Ghanam al-Awsi
 Tameem mawla Khirash ibn as-Simmah al-Khazraji

Tha'

 Thabit ibn Aqram al-Awsi
 Thabit ibn Tha'labah al-Khazraji
 Thabit ibn Khalid al-Khazraji
 Thabit ibn Khansa' al-Khazraji
 Thabit ibn 'Amr al-Khazraji
 Thabit ibn Hazzal al-Khazraji
 Tha'labah ibn Hatib ibn 'Amr al-Awsi
 Tha'labah ibn 'Amr al-Khazraji
 Tha'labah ibn Ghanamah al-Khazraji
 Thaqf ibn 'Amr al-Muhajiri

Jeem

 Jabir ibn Khalid ibn 'Abd al-Ash-hal al-Khazraji
 Jabir ibn 'Abdillah ibn Ri'ab al-Khazraji
 Jabbar ibn Sakhr al-Khazraji
 Jabr ibn 'Atak al-Awsi
 Jubayr ibn Iyas al-Khazraji

Ha'
 
 al-Harith ibn Anas al-Awsi
 al-Harith ibn Aws ibn Rafi' al-Awsi
 al-Harith ibn Aws ibn Mu'adh al-Awsi
 al-Harith ibn Hatib al-Awsi
 al-Harith ibn Khazamah ibn 'Ada al-Awsi
 al-Harith ibn Khazamah al-Khazraji
 al-Harith ibn Abi Khazamah al-Awsi
 al-Harith ibn as-Simmah al-Khazraji
 al-Harith ibn 'Arfajah al-Awsi
 al-Harith ibn Qays al-Awsi
 al-Harith ibn Qays al-Khazraji
 al-Harith ibn an-Nu'man ibn Umayya al-Awsi
 Harithah ibn Suraqa ash-Shahad al-Khazraji
 Harithah ibn an-Nu'man ibn Zayd al-Khazraji
 Hatib ibn Abi Balta'ah al-Muhajiri
 Hatib ibn 'Amr al-Muhajiri
 Hubeeb ibn al-Mundhir al-Khazraji
 Habeeb ibn al-Aswad al-Khazraji
 Haram ibn Milhan al-Khazraji
 Hurayth ibn Zayd al-Khazraji
 Husayn ibn al-Harith ibn al-Muttalib al-Muhajiri
 Hamza ibn al-Humayyir al-Khazraji
 Hamza ibn 'Abd al-Muttalib al-Muhajiri

Kha'

 Kharijah ibn al-Humayr al-Khazraji
 Kharijah ibn Zayd al-Khazraji
 Khalid ibn al-Bukayr al-Muhajiri
 Khalid ibn Qays al-Khazraji
 Khabbab ibn al-Aratt al-Muhajiri
 Khabbab mawla 'Utba al-Muhajiri
 Khubayb ibn Isaf al-Khazraji
 Khubayb ibn 'Ada al-Khazraji
 Khidash ibn Qatadah al-Awsi
 Khirash ibn as-Simmah al-Khazraji
 Khuraym ibn Fatik al-Muhajiri
 Khallad ibn Rafi' al-Khazraji
 Khallad ibn Suwayd al-Khazraji
 Khallad ibn 'Amr al-Khazraji
 Khallad ibn Qays al-Khazraji
 Khulayd ibn Qays al-Khazraji
 Khalafa ibn 'Ada al-Khazraji
 Khunays ibn Hudhafah al-Muhajiri
 Khawwat ibn Jubayr al-Awsi
 Khawla ibn Abi Khawla al-Muhajiri

Dhal

 Dhakwan ibn 'Abdi Qays al-Khazraji
 Dhakwan ibn Sa'd al-Khazraji
 Dhu'sh-shimalayn ibn 'Abd 'Amr ash-Shahad al-Muhajiri (Zish Shamalain Umair bin Abd Umro Al Khaza'i)

Ra

 Rashid ibn al-Mu'alla al-Khazraji
 Rafi' ibn al-Harith al-Khazraji
 Rafi' ibn al-Mu'alla ash-Shahad al-Khazraji
 Rafi' ibn 'Unjudah al-Awsi
 Rafi' ibn Malik al-Khazraji
 Rafi' ibn Yazeed al-Awsi
 Rib'a ibn Rafi' al-Awsi
 Rabee' ibn Iyas al-Khazraji
 Rabee'ah ibn Aktham al-Muhajiri
 Rukhaylah ibn Tha'labah al-Khazraji
 Rifa'ah ibn al-Harith al-Khazraji
 Rifa'ah ibn Rafi' al-Khazraji
 Rifa'ah ibn 'Abd al-Mundhir al-Awsi
 Rifa'ah ibn 'Amr al-Khazraji

Za

 Ziyad ibn as-Sakan al-Awsi
 Ziyad ibn 'Amr al-Khazraji
 Ziyad ibn Labad al-Khazraji
 Zayd ibn Aslam al-Awsi
 Zayd ibn Harithah mawla Rasalillah al-Muhajiri
 Zayd ibn al-Khattab al-Muhajiri
 Zayd ibn al-Muzayyin al-Khazraji
 Zayd ibn al-Mu'alla al-Khazraji
 Zayd ibn Wada'ah al-Khazraji

Seen

 Salim ibn 'Umayr al-Awsi
 Salim mawla Abi Hudhayfa al-Muhajiri
 As-Sa'ib ibn 'Uthman ibn Maz'an al-Muhajiri
 Sabrah ibn Fatik al-Muhajiri
 Subay' ibn Qays al-Khazraji
 Suraqa ibn 'Amr al-Khazraji
 Suraqa ibn Ka'b al-Khazraji
 Sa'd ibn Khawlah al-Muhajiri
 Sa'd ibn Khaythama ash-Shahad al-Awsi
 Sa'd ibn ar-Raba' al-Khazraji
 Sa'd ibn Zayd al-Awsi
 Sa'd ibn Sa'd al-Khazraji
 Sa'd ibn Suhayl al-Khazraji
 Sa'd ibn 'Ubada al-Khazraji
 Sa'd ibn 'Ubayd al-Awsi
 Sa'd ibn 'Uthman al-Khazraji
 Sa'd ibn Mu'adh al-Awsi
 Sa'd mawla Hatib Abi Balta'a al-Muhajiri
 Sufyan ibn Bishr al-Khazraji
 Salamah ibn Aslam al-Awsi
 Salamah ibn Thabit al-Awsi
 Salamah ibn Salamah al-Awsi
 Salat ibn Qays al-Khazraji
 Sulaym ibn al-Harith al-Khazraji
 Sulaym ibn 'Amr al-Khazraji
 Sulaym ibn Qays al-Khazraji
 Sulaym ibn Milhan al-Khazraji
 Simak ibn Sa'd al-Khazraji
 Sinan ibn Sayfa al-Khazraji
 Sinan ibn Abi Sinan ibn Mihsan al-Muhajiri
 Sahl ibn Hunayf al-Awsi
 Sahl ibn Rafi' al-Khazraji
 Sahl ibn 'Atak al-Khazraji
 Sahl ibn Qays al-Khazraji
 Suhayl ibn Rafi' al-Khazraji
 Suhayl ibn Wahb al-Muhajiri
 Sawad ibn Razam al-Khazraji
 Sawad ibn Ghaziyyah al-Khazraji
 Suwaybit ibn Sa'd ibn Harmalah al-Muhajiri

Sheen

 Shuja' ibn Wahb ibn Raba'ah al-Muhajiri
 Sharak ibn Anas al-Awsi
 Shammas ibn 'Uthman al-Muhajiri

Sad

 Sabah mawla Abi'l 'as al-Muhajiri
 Safwan ibn Wahb ash-Shahad al-Muhajiri
 Suhayb ibn Sinan ar-Rami al-Muhajiri
 Sayfiyy ibn Sawad al-Khazraji

Dad

 Dahhak ibn al-Harithah al-Khazraji
 Dahhak ibn 'Abdi 'Amr al-Khazraji
 Damrah ibn 'Amr al-Khazraji

Ta'

 Tufayl ibn al-Harith ibn al-Muttalib al-Muhajiri
 Tufayl ibn Malik al-Khazraji
 Tufayl ibn an-Nu'man al-Khazraji
 Tulayb ibn 'Umayr al-Muhajiri

Za'

 Zuhayr ibn Rafi' al-Awsi

'Ayn

 'asim ibn Thabit al-Awsi
 'asim ibn 'Ada al-Awsi
 'asim ibn al-'Ukayr al-Khazraji
 'asim ibn Qays al-Awsi
 'aqil ibn al-Bukayr ash-Shahad al-Muhajiri
 'amir ibn Umayyah al-Khazraji
 'amir ibn al-Bukayr al-Muhajiri
 'amir ibn Raba'ah al-Muhajiri
 'amir ibn Sa'd al-Khazraji
 'amir ibn Salamah al-Khazraji
 'amir ibn Fuhayrah al-Muhajiri
 'amir ibn Mukhallad al-Khazraji
 'aidh ibn Ma'is al-Khazraji
 'Abbad ibn Bishr al-Awsi
 'Ubbad ibn al-Khashkhash al-Khazraji
 'Abbad ibn Qays ibn 'amir al-Khazraji
 'Abbad ibn Qays ibn 'Ayshah al-Khazraji
 'Ubadah ibn as-Samit al-Khazraji
 'AbdAllah ibn Tha'labah al-Khazraji
 'AbdAllah ibn Jubayr al-Awsi
 'AbdAllah ibn Jahsh al-Muhajiri
 'AbdAllah ibn Jadd ibn Qays al-Khazraji
 'AbdAllah ibn al-Humayr al-Khazraji
 'AbdAllah ibn ar-Raba' al-Khazraji
 'AbdAllah ibn Rawaha al-Khazraji
 'AbdAllah ibn Zayd ibn Tha'labah al-Khazraji
 'AbdAllah ibn Suraqa al-Muhajiri
 'AbdAllah ibn Salamah al-Awsi
 'AbdAllah ibn Sahl al-Awsi
 'AbdAllah ibn Suhayl ibn 'Amr al-Muhajiri
 'AbdAllah ibn Sharak al-Awsi
 'AbdAllah ibn Tariq al-Awsi
 'AbdAllah ibn 'amir al-Khazraji
 'AbdAllah ibn 'Abdillah ibn Ubay ibn Salal al-Khazraji
 'AbdAllah ibn 'Abdi Manaf ibn an-Nu'man al-Khazraji
 'AbdAllah ibn 'Abs al-Khazraji
 'AbdAllah ibn 'Urfutah al-Khazraji
 'AbdAllah ibn 'Amr al-Khazraji
 'AbdAllah ibn 'Umayr al-Khazraji
 'AbdAllah ibn Qays ibn Khaldah ibn Khalid al-Khazraji
 'AbdAllah ibn Qays ibn Sakhr al-Khazraji
 'AbdAllah ibn Ka'b al-Khazraji
 'AbdAllah ibn Makhramah al-Muhajiri
 'AbdAllah ibn Mas'ad al-Muhajiri
 'AbdAllah ibn Maz'an al-Muhajiri
 'AbdAllah ibn an-Nu'man al-Khazraji
 'Abdu'rRahman ibn Jabr al-Awsi
 'Abdu Rabbihi ibn Haqq al-Khazraji
 'Abs ibn 'amir al-Khazraji
 'Ubayd ibn Aws al-Awsi
 'Ubayd ibn at-Tayyihan al-Awsi
 'Ubayd ibn Zayd al-Khazraji
 'Ubayd ibn Abi 'Ubayd al-Awsi
 'Ubaydah ibn al-Harith ash-Shahad al-Muhajiri
 'Itban ibn Malik al-Muhajiri
 'Utbah ibn Raba'ah al-Khazraji
 'Utbah ibn 'Abdillah al-Khazraji
 'Utbah ibn Ghazwan al-Muhajiri
 'Uthman ibn Maz'an al-Muhajiri
 al-'Ajlan ibn an-Nu'man al-Khazraji
 'Adiyy ibn Abi az-Zaghba' al-Khazraji
 'Ismah ibn al-Husayn al-Khazraji
 'Usaymah halaf min Ashja' al-Khazraji
 'Atiyya ibn Nuwayrah al-Khazraji
 'Uqbah ibn 'amir ibn Naba al-Khazraji
 'Uqbah ibn 'Uthman al-Khazraji
 'Uqbah ibn Wahb ibn Khaldah al-Khazraji
 'Uqbah ibn Wahb ibn Raba'ah al-Muhajiri
 'Ukkasha ibn Mihsan al-Muhajiri
 'Ammar ibn Yasir al-Muhajiri
 'Umarah ibn Hazm al-Khazraji
 'Umarah ibn Ziyad al-Awsi
 'Amr ibn Iyas al-Khazraji
 'Amr ibn Tha'labah al-Khazraji
 'Amr ibn al-Jamah al-Khazraji
 'Amr ibn al-Harith ibn Zuhayr al-Muhajiri
 'Amr ibn al-Harith ibn Tha'laba al-Khazraji
 'Amr ibn Suraqa al-Muhajiri
 'Amr ibn Abi Sarh al-Muhajiri
 'Amr ibn Talq al-Khazraji
 'Amr ibn 'Awf al-Muhajiri
 'Amr ibn Qays ibn Zayd al-Khazraji
 'Amr ibn Mu'adh al-Awsi
 'Amr ibn Ma'bad al-Awsi
 'Umayr ibn Haram ibn al-Jamah al-Khazraji
 'Umayr ibn al-Humam ash-Shahad al-Khazraji
 'Umayr ibn 'amir al-Khazraji
 'Umayr ibn Abi Waqqas ash-Shahad al-Muhajiri
 'Antarah mawla Sulaym ibn 'Amr al-Khazraji
 'Awf ibn al-Harith ash-Shahad al-Khazraji
 'Uwaym ibn Sa'idah al-Awsi
 'Iyad ibn Zuhayr al-Muhajiri

Ghayn

Ghannam ibn Aws al-Khazraji.

Fa'

 Fakih ibn Bishr al-Khazraji
 Farwah ibn 'Amr al-Khazraji

Qaf

 Qatadah ibn an-Nu'man al-Awsi
 Qudamah ibn Maz'an al-Muhajiri
 Qutbah ibn 'amir al-Khazraji
 Qays ibn as-Sakan al-Khazraji
 Qays ibn 'Amr ibn Zayd al-Khazraji
 Qays ibn Mihsan al-Khazraji
 Qays ibn Mukhallad al-Khazraji

Kaaf

 Ka'b ibn Jammaz al-Khazraji
 Ka'b ibn Zayd al-Khazraji

Laam

Libdah ibn Qays al-Khazraji

Meem

 Malik ibn ad-Dukhshum al-Khazraji
 Malik ibn Raba'ah al-Khazraji
 Malik ibn Rifa'ah al-Khazraji
 Malik ibn 'Amr al-Muhajiri
 Malik ibn Qudama ibn 'Arfajah al-Awsi
 Malik ibn Mas'ad al-Khazraji
 Malik ibn Numaylah al-Awsi
 Malik ibn Abi Khawla al-Muhajiri
 Mubash-shir ibn 'Abdi'l Mundhir ash-Shahad al-Awsi
 al-Mujadhdhar ibn Ziyad al-Khazraji
 Muhriz ibn 'amir al-Khazraji
 Muhriz ibn Nadlah al-Muhajiri
 Muhammad ibn Maslamah al-Awsi
 Midlaj ibn 'Amr al-Muhajiri
 Murarah ibn ar-Raba' al-Awsi
 Marthad ibn Abi Marthad al-Muhajiri
 Mistah ibn Uthatha al-Muhajiri
 Mas'ad ibn Aws al-Khazraji
 Mas'ad ibn Khaldah al-Khazraji
 Mas'ad ibn Raba'ah al-Muhajiri
 Mas'ad ibn Zayd al-Khazraji
 Mas'ad ibn Sa'd ibn Qays al-Khazraji
 Mas'ad ibn 'Abdi Sa'd ibn 'amir al-Awsi
 Mus'ab ibn 'Umayr al-Muhajiri
 Muzahhir ibn Rafi' al-Awsi
 Mu'adh ibn Jabal al-Khazraji
 Mu'adh ibn al-Harith al-Khazraji
 Mu'adh ibn as-Simmah al-Khazraji
 Mu'adh ibn 'Amr bin al-Jamah al-Khazraji
 Mu'adh ibn Ma'is al-Khazraji
 Ma'bad ibn 'Abbad al-Khazraji
 Ma'bad ibn Qays al-Khazraji
 Mu'attib ibn 'Ubayd al-Awsi
 Mu'attib ibn 'Awf al-Muhajiri
 Mu'attib ibn Qushayr al-Awsi
 Ma'qil ibn al-Mundhir al-Khazraji
 Ma'mar ibn al-Harith al-Muhajiri
 Ma'n ibn 'Adiyy al-Awsi
 Ma'n ibn Yazeed al-Muhajiri
 Mu'awwidh ibn al-Harith ash-Shahad al-Khazraji
 Mu'awwidh ibn 'Amr ibn al-Jamah al-Khazraji
 al-Miqdad ibn 'Amr al-Muhajiri
 Mulayl ibn Wabrah al-Khazraji
 al-Mundhir ibn 'Amr al-Khazraji
 al-Mundhir ibn Qudama ibn 'Arfajah al-Awsi
 al-Mundhir ibn Muhammad al-Awsi
 Mihja' ibn Salih ash-Shahad al-Muhajiri

Noon

 an-Nasr ibn al-Harith al-Awsi
 Nu'man ibn al-A'raj ibn Malik al-Khazraji
 Nu'man ibn Sinan al-Khazraji
 Nu'man ibn 'Asr al-Awsi
 Nu'man ibn 'Amr ibn Rifa'ah al-Khazraji
 Nu'man ibn 'Abdi 'Amr al-Khazraji
 Nu'man ibn Malik al-Khazraji
 Nu'man ibn Abi Khazamah al-Awsi
 Nu'ayman ibn 'Amr al-Khazraji
 Nawfal ibn 'Abdillah al-Khazraji
  
Ha'

 Hana' ibn Niyar al-Awsi
 Hubayl ibn Wabrah al-Khazraji
 Hilal ibn 'Umayya al-Waqifa al-Khazraji
 Hilal ibn al-Mu'alla al-Khazraji

Waw

 Waqid ibn 'Abdillah al-Muhajiri
 Wada'ah ibn 'Amr al-Khazraji
 Waraqa ibn Iyas al-Khazraji
 Wahb ibn Sa'd ibn Abi Sarh al-Muhajiri

Ya'

 Yazeed ibn al-Akhnas al-Muhajiri
 Yazeed ibn al-Harith ibn Fushum ash-Shahad al-Khazraji
 Yazeed ibn Hiram al-Khazraji
 Yazeed ibn Ruqaysh al-Muhajiri
 Yazeed ibn as-Sakan al-Awsi
 Yazeed ibn al-Mundhir al-Khazraji

Al-Kuniyah

 Abu'l A'war, ibn al-Harith al-Khazraji
 Abi Ayyab al-Ansara, Khalid ibn Zayd al-Khazraji
 Abi Habbah, ibn 'Amr ibn Thabit al-Awsi
 Abi Habab, ibn Zayd al-Khazraji
 Abi Hudhayfa, Mihsham ibn 'Utba al-Muhajiri
 Abi Hasan, ibn 'Amr al-Khazraji
 Abu'l Hamra' mawla al-Harith al-Khazraji
 Abi Hannah, ibn Malik al-Awsi
 Abi Kharijah, 'Amr ibn Qays ibn Malik al-Khazraji
 Abi Khuzaymah, ibn Aws al-Khazraji
 Abi Khallad, ibn Qays al-Khazraji
 Abi Dawad, 'Umayr ibn 'amir al-Khazraji
 Abi Dujanah, Simak ibn Kharashah al-Khazraji
 Abi Sabrah mawla Abi Ruhm al-Muhajiri
 Abi Salamah, 'AbdAllah ibn 'Abd al-Asad al-Muhajiri
 Abi Salat, Usayra ibn 'Amr al-Khazraji
 Abi Sinan, ibn Mihsan al-Muhajiri
 Abi Shaykh, Ubayy ibn Thabit al-Khazraji
 Abi Sirmah, ibn Qays al-Khazraji
 Abi Dayyah, ibn Thabit al-Awsi
 Abi Talha, Zayd ibn Sahl al-Khazraji
 Abi 'Abs, ibn Jabr ibn 'Amr al-Awsi
 Abi 'Aqal, 'Abdu'rRahman ibn 'Abdillah al-Awsi
 Abi Qatadah, ibn Rib'iyy al-Khazraji
 Abi Qays, ibn al-Mu'alla al-Khazraji
 Abi Kabshah mawla Rasalillah al-Muhajiri
 Abi Lubabah, Bashar ibn 'Abd al-Mundhir al-Awsi
 Abi Makhshiyy, Suwayd ibn Makhshiyy al-Muhajiri
 Abi Marthad, Kannaz ibn Hisn al-Muhajiri
 Abi Mas'ad al-Badra, 'Uqbah ibn 'Amr al-Khazraji
 Abi Mulayl, ibn al-Az'ar al-Awsi
 Abu'l Mundhir, ibn 'amir al-Khazraji
 Abu'l Haytham, Malik at-Tayyihan al-Awsi
 Abu'l Yasar, Ka'b ibn 'Amr al-Khazraji.

Shuhada (Muslim Martyrs of the Battle of Badr)

 Haritha bin Suraqa al-Khazraji.
 Zish Shamalain Umair bin Abd Umro Al Khaza'i
 Rafi' bin al-Mu'alla al-Khazraji.
 Sa'd bin Khaythama al-Awsi.
 Safwan bin Wahb al-Muhajiri.
 'Aaqil bin al-Bukayr al-Muhajiri.
 'Ubayda bin al-Harith al-Muhajiri.
 'Umayr bin al-Humam al-Khazraji.
 'Umayr bin Abi Waqqas al-Muhajiri.
 'Awf bin al-Harith al-Khazraji.
 Mubashshir bin 'Abdi'l Mundhir al-Awsi.
 Mu'awwidh bin al-Harith al-Khazraji.
 Mihja' bin Salih al-Muhajiri.
 Yazid bin al-Harith bin Fus.hum al-Khazraji.

References 
Ishaq, Ibn, and A. Guillaume. "The Great Expedition of Badr." The Life of Muhammad: A Translation of Ishāq's Sīrat Rasūl Allāh. Lahore: Pakistan Branch, Oxford UP,. Digital. (https://archive.org/details/TheLifeOfMohammedGuillaume)

Battle of Badr
List Battle of Badr
Military personnel killed in action